The Chrysler Crossfire is a rear-wheel drive, two-seat sports car that was sold by Chrysler and built by Karmann of Germany for the 2004 through 2008 model years.

Developed during the union of Daimler and Chrysler, the two-seater is based on the Mercedes-Benz R170 platform which shares 80% of its components with the first generation SLK. The second generation SLK was built on a new R171 platform starting in the 2005 model year; the R170 platform was essentially handed down to Chrysler for use in building the Crossfire. Having initially arrived in 2001 as a concept car styled by Eric Stoddard, the Chrysler was further refined by Andrew Dyson before production began in 2003 for 2004 model year sales.

Design 
The name "Crossfire" refers to the two character lines that run from front to rear along the body sides — their crease directions cross below the mirrors on the door panels. Conceived during the period of Chrysler's ownership by Daimler-Benz, the name also refers to the collaboration of the two companies.

The Chrysler Crossfire concept car was introduced at the 2001 North American International Auto Show and the production version was unveiled at the 2002 Los Angeles Auto Show as a 2004 model "is as faithful a translation from concept to production as any in recent memory." The concept car was made "to evoke a strong, passionate, emotional response. We had to retain that. We want to polarize our audience—we want people to love it or hate it." Conceived to be a two-seat image building or halo car for the Chrysler brand, the marketing objective was also to make use of available components using a two-seat roadster chassis. The production car shares about 39% of its parts with Mercedes-Benz vehicles and Chrysler dealers were required to invest in special equipment, tools, and parts to be able to sell the new luxury model. The rear-wheel-drive Crossfire coupe design objective was to make an "impression" with looks that are "unique, almost sculptural."

The Crossfire's visual presence includes a wide body raked over relatively huge 19-inch rear wheels and 18-inch front wheels. The most distinctive design element is the fastback roof and broad rear fenders made for a rear end design that prompted automotive journalists and writers to compare the new car to American Motors' 1965–1967 AMC Marlin. The "distinctive boat-tail rear end that reminds more than one observer of the old Rambler Marlin." For example, Rob Rothwell wrote "... when I first espied the rear lines of the Chrysler Crossfire I was instantly transported back to 1965 and my favorite car of that year, the Rambler Marlin." Motor Trend also compared the "provocative boattail theme" of the 2004 Crossfire's sheetmetal to that of the AMC Marlin fastback. Likewise, the new Chrysler's boat-tail is "formed as the edges of the roof converge into a kind of teardrop shape, leaving the rear fenders to flare out over the rear wheels."

Chrysler themselves said the Crossfire took inspiration from the 1930s art deco period and buildings such as the Chrysler Building. Motor Trend cites vehicle influences from 1930s including Bugattis and the Talbot Lago. Chrysler wanted to once again offer a performance coupe reminiscent of the luxury reputation they enjoyed during the late 1950s to mid-1960s with the Chrysler 300 letter series coupes and convertibles.

Construction and features 

Chrysler executed the interior and exterior styling. All other elements of the car such as wheelbase, track, engine, transmission, chassis structure, suspension components, are shared with the R170 platform. An example of this is the engine bay of the Crossfire, which is virtually identical to the Mercedes-Benz SLK320 on the R170 platform. The seats from the Mercedes-Benz SLK320 would bolt directly into the Crossfire chassis. The dashboard layout, controls, and instruments are also similar to those on the Mercedes-Benz SLK320.

The standard transmission is a 6-speed manual with an optional 5-speed automatic.

The SRT-6 models were equipped with a supercharged version of the M112 engine built by Mercedes' performance branch, AMG. The SRT-6 models came only with the 5-speed automatic transmission, consistent with AMG cars of the same era. The 6-speed transmission used by the Chrysler Crossfire is a variant of the Mercedes sourced NSG-370. The 5-speed automatic transmission in the Crossfire (known as 5G-Tronic) is also Mercedes-sourced and a variant of the 722.6 family. The automatic transmission-equipped Crossfires achieve a better EPA fuel efficiency rating over the 6MT, mostly due to the difference in gear ratios.

Unlike most cars of its time, the Crossfire does not use a rack and pinion steering system; instead, it utilizes a recirculating ball system as employed on the donor R170 platform. Front suspension is unequal length (SLA) double wishbone suspension with 5 point multi-link in the rear. Just like the concept car, all Crossfire models were built with two different wheel sizes measuring 18x7.5-inch on the front and 19x9-inch on the rear. Standard all-season tires were 225/40R18 on the front and 255/35R19 on the rear.

The first production Crossfire was driven off the assembly line on 3 February 2003, by Chrysler Group's COO Wolfgang Bernhard in Germany.

Equipment 
The Chrysler Crossfire's standard features included large alloy wheels with performance-rated tires, a Becker (part of Harman/Kardon)–sourced AM/FM stereo with anti-theft system and a single-disc CD player, keyless entry with security alarm, a power-retractable rear wing spoiler, leather-trimmed seating surfaces, dual power front sports bucket seats, full instrumentation, a 3.2 L V6 engine with a manual transmission, rear-wheel-drive (RWD), a leather-wrapped and stitched steering wheel, a power-retractable cloth convertible roof (for convertible models), front floor mats, and air conditioning.

Optional features on the Chrysler Crossfire included an automatic transmission, a six-speaker premium Infinity sound system with two "subwoofers" mounted directly behind each seat, a CD-based GPS navigational system, exterior paint colors, and additional interior color choices.

Sales and production numbers 
The original contract with Karmann to build the Crossfire was for about five years with an annual sales target of 20,000 units in the United States. Sales of the Crossfire were slow, with an average 230-day supply of the vehicles during November 2005. A small number of Crossfires were imported to the United States and Mexico in 2006 (and almost all of these were roadsters).

Chrysler discontinued the Crossfire after the 2008 model year, as part of its restructuring plans. The last Crossfire rolled off of the assembly line on December 17, 2007.

Notes:
 LHD = Left hand drive (steering wheel on the left side)
 RHD = Right hand drive (steering wheel on the right side)
 Crossfire Coupe and Crossfire Roadster refer to the "Base" model

 Note: Cars produced in one calendar year may be marketed as the following model year.

Models

Base and Limited 
For the first model year (2004), only the coupe was offered (with no trim levels), equipped quite similarly to the next year's Limited model. Two models were available for the 2005 model year; Coupe and Roadster, each with three trim levels: Base (with fewer amenities), Limited, and SRT-6 (supercharged). An SE Roadster model (essentially a base model) in 2006-2007 was available only in Blaze Red Crystal Pearl and with black accented 15-spoke SRT-6 style wheels. Base Crossfire models, both Coupe and Roadster, have black painted windshield frames, black filler plugs (in place of fog lights) in the front fascia, and fabric seats with separate, movable headrests. Limited and SRT-6 models, both Coupe and Roadster, all have silver-painted windshield frames and are equipped with fog lights. The Limited has leather upholstery. The SRT-6 model has unique leather/Alcantara upholstery. All Base and Limited Crossfire models included an electronic wing on the back hatch that would go up at about 65 mph and comes back down at 45 mph. The wing had a manual switch to raise and lower it at any speed.

SRT-6 

Other SRT-6 model-specific features included suspension and brake modifications, a front fascia air dam, and a fixed rear spoiler. The Crossfire SRT-6 model used the same drivetrain, suspension, and braking components as those used on the Mercedes-Benz SLK 32 AMG. The standard tires were upgraded to Z-rated Michelin Pilot Sports, sized 225/40R18 on the front and 255/35R19s in the back.
The SRT-6 cars did not feature the electronic wing that the Base and Standard cars featured.

In 2006, the SRT-6 was changed to special order only.

Notes

References

External links 

 Chrysler Crossfire SRT-6 website
 
 

Crossfire
Roadsters
Coupés
Rear-wheel-drive vehicles
Retro-style automobiles
Cars introduced in 2003
Karmann vehicles